Artur Feliksovich Galoyan (born 25 June 1999) is a professional football player who plays for FC Alania Vladikavkaz. Born in Russia, he plays for the Armenia national team.

Club career
He made his debut in the Russian Professional Football League for FC Torpedo Moscow on 27 July 2017 in a game against FC Metallurg Lipetsk. He made his Russian Football National League debut for Torpedo on 7 July 2019 in a game against FC Fakel Voronezh.

International career
Born in Russia, Galoyan is of Armenian descent. He debuted with the Armenia national team in a friendly 2–0 loss to Albania on 19 November 2022.

References

External links
 Profile by Russian Professional Football League

1999 births
Footballers from Moscow
Russian people of Armenian descent
Living people
Armenian footballers
Armenia international footballers
Russian footballers
Association football midfielders
FC Torpedo Moscow players
FC Veles Moscow players
FC Spartak Vladikavkaz players
Russian First League players
Russian Second League players